Ihy is a god in ancient Egyptian mythology who represents the ecstasy of playing the sistrum. His name means "sistrum player". This is in allusion to his relationship with the goddess Hathor who was often said to be his mother. Ihy's symbols are the sistrum and a necklace. The name Ihy depicts the joy of playing the hand instrument by Hathor.

Other goddesses including Isis, Sekhmet, and Neith are also sometimes seen as his mothers in different legends. War deity Horus is Ihy's father, but sometimes solar deity Ra is also seen as his father. Ihy was depicted as a naked child, with curly hair, wearing a necklace and holding a sistrum or as a nude child with his finger in his mouth. He was worshipped along with Horus and Hathor at Dendera.

Emperor Augustus prepared a maternity ward in the temple of Ihy's mother, with pictures of Ihy's birth and celebrations painted on the wall. Ihy is shown as the god of bread, beer, coffins, and the "Book of the dead".

References

External links
 

Egyptian gods

Music and singing gods